This is a list of wars involving Israel. Since its declaration of independence in May 1948, the State of Israel has fought and won eight recognized wars with its neighbouring Arab states, two major Palestinian Arab uprisings known as the First Intifada and the Second Intifada (see Israeli–Palestinian conflict), and a broad series of other armed engagements rooted in the Arab–Israeli conflict.

Wars and other conflicts
Israel has been involved in a number of wars and large-scale military operations, including:
1948 Arab–Israeli War (November 1947 – July 1949) – Started as 6 months of civil war between Jewish and Arab militias when the mandate period in Palestine was ending and turned into a regular war after the establishment of Israel and the intervention of several Arab armies. In its conclusion, a set of agreements were signed between Israel, Egypt, Jordan, Lebanon, and Syria, called the 1949 Armistice Agreements, which established the armistice lines between Israel and its neighbours, also known as the Green Line.
Palestinian Fedayeen insurgency (1950s–1960s) – Palestinian attacks and reprisal operations carried out by the Israel Defense Forces during the 1950s and 1960s. These actions were in response to constant fedayeen incursions during which Arab guerrillas infiltrated from Syria, Egypt, and Jordan into Israel to carry out attacks against Israeli civilians and soldiers. The policy of the reprisal operations was exceptional due to Israel's declared aim of getting a high 'blood cost' among the enemy side which was believed to be necessary in order to deter them from committing future attacks.
Suez Crisis (October 1956) – A military attack on Egypt by Britain, France, and Israel, beginning on 29 October 1956, with the intention to occupy the Sinai Peninsula and to take over the Suez Canal. The attack followed Egypt's decision of 26 July 1956 to nationalize the Suez Canal after the withdrawal of an offer by Britain and the United States to fund the building of the Aswan Dam. Although the Israeli invasion of the Sinai was successful, the United States and USSR forced it to retreat. Even so, Israel managed to re-open the Straits of Tiran and pacified its southern border.
Six-Day War (June 1967) – Fought between Israel and Arab neighbors Egypt, Jordan, and Syria. The nations of Iraq, Saudi Arabia, Kuwait, Algeria, and others also contributed troops and arms to the Arab forces. Following the war, the territory held by Israel expanded significantly ("The Purple Line") : The West Bank (including East Jerusalem) from Jordan, Golan Heights from Syria, Sinai and Gaza from Egypt.
War of Attrition (1967–1970) – A limited war fought between the Israeli military and forces of the Egyptian Republic, the USSR, Jordan, Syria, and the Palestine Liberation Organization from 1967 to 1970. It was initiated by the Egyptians as a way of recapturing the Sinai from the Israelis, who had been in control of the territory since the mid-1967 Six-Day War. The hostilities ended with a ceasefire signed between the countries in 1970 with frontiers remaining in the same place as when the war began.
Yom Kippur War (October 1973) – Fought from 6 to 26 October 1973 by a coalition of Arab states led by Egypt and Syria against Israel as a way of recapturing part of the territories which they lost to the Israelis back in the Six-Day War. The war began with a surprise joint attack by Egypt and Syria on the Jewish holiday of Yom Kippur. Egypt and Syria crossed the cease-fire lines in the Sinai and Golan Heights, respectively. Eventually Arab forces were defeated by Israel and there were no significant territorial changes.
Palestinian insurgency in South Lebanon (1971–1982) – PLO relocate to South Lebanon from Jordan and stage attacks on the Galilee and as a base for international operations. In 1978, Israel launches Operation Litani – the first Israeli large-scale invasion of Lebanon, which was carried out by the Israel Defense Forces in order to expel PLO forces from the territory. Continuing ground and rocket attacks, and Israeli retaliations, eventually escalate into the 1982 War.
1982 Lebanon War (1982) – Began on 6 June 1982, when the Israel Defense Forces invaded southern Lebanon to expel the PLO from the territory. The Government of Israel ordered the invasion as a response to the assassination attempt against Israel's ambassador to the United Kingdom, Shlomo Argov, by the Abu Nidal Organization and due to the constant terror attacks on northern Israel made by the Palestinian guerrilla organizations which resided in Lebanon. The war resulted in the expulsion of the PLO from Lebanon and created an Israeli Security Zone in southern Lebanon.
South Lebanon conflict (1985–2000) – Nearly 15 years of warfare between the Israel Defense Forces and its Lebanese Christian proxy militias against Lebanese Muslim guerrilla, led by Iranian-backed Hezbollah, within what was defined by Israelis as the "Security Zone" in South Lebanon.
First Intifada (1987–1993) – First large-scale Palestinian uprising against Israel in the West Bank and the Gaza Strip.
Second Intifada (2000–2005) – Second Palestinian uprising, a period of intensified violence, which began in late September 2000.
2006 Lebanon War (summer 2006) – Began as a military operation in response to the abduction of two Israeli reserve soldiers by the Hezbollah. The operation gradually strengthened, to become a wider confrontation. The principal participants were Hezbollah paramilitary forces and the Israeli military. The conflict started on 12 July 2006 and continued until a United Nations-brokered ceasefire went into effect on 14 August 2006, though it formally ended on 8 September 2006, when Israel lifted its naval blockade of Lebanon. The war resulted in a stalemate.
Gaza War or Operation Cast Lead (December 2008 – January 2009) – Three-week armed conflict between Israel and Hamas during the winter of 2008–2009. In an escalation of the ongoing Israeli–Palestinian conflict, Israel responded to ongoing rocket fire from the Gaza Strip with military force in an action titled "Operation Cast Lead". Israel opened the attack with a surprise air strike on 27 December 2008. Israel's stated aim was to stop such rocket fire from and the import of arms into Gaza. Israeli forces attacked military and civilian targets, police stations, and government buildings in the opening assault. Israel declared an end to the conflict on 18 January and completed its withdrawal on 21 January 2009.
2012 Israeli operation in the Gaza Strip or Operation Pillar of Defense (November 2012) – Military offensive on the Gaza Strip.
2014 Gaza War or Operation Protective Edge (July–August 2014) – Military offensive on the Gaza Strip as a response to the collapse of American-sponsored peace talks, attempts by rival Palestinian factions to form a coalition government, the kidnapping and murder of three Israeli teenagers, the subsequent kidnapping and murder of a Palestinian teenager, and increased rocket attacks on Israel by Hamas militants.
Syrian Civil War and the Iran–Israel conflict during the Syrian civil war. 
2021 Israel–Palestine crisis or Operation Guardian of the Walls (May 2021) – There were riots between Jews and Arabs in Israeli cities. Also Hamas in Gaza sent military rockets into Israel and Iron Dome intercepted most dangerous rockets. Israel attacked targets in Gaza.

Table
Conflicts considered as wars by the Israeli Ministry of Defense (as they were named by Israel) are marked in bold.

Other armed conflicts involving the IDF

See also

 History of the Israel Defense Forces
 History of the Israeli Air Force
 Iran–Israel proxy conflict
 Israeli casualties of war
 Jewish military history
 List of modern conflicts in the Middle East
 List of wars involving the State of Palestine
 Timeline of Israeli history
 Timeline of the Arab–Israeli conflict
 Violent conflicts involving the Yishuv

References

External links

 Israel's Wars at the Israel Ministry of Foreign Affairs
 Israel's Wars & Operations at the Jewish Virtual Library
 

 
Israel Defense Forces
Wars
Israeli military-related lists
Israel